3LW is the debut studio album by American girl group 3LW. It was released through Epic Records on December 5, 2000. The album contains their hit singles "No More (Baby I'ma Do Right)" and "Playas Gon' Play". 3LW peaked at number 29 on the US Billboard 200 and was certified Platinum by Recording Industry Association of America (RIAA). To date it has sold 1.3 million copies in the US.

Background and production
In April 1999, Kiely Williams, Adrienne Bailon and Naturi Naughton met each other at an audition. The following week later the trio went to a recording studio to record a 4-song demo tape. Eventually they caught the attention of Sony Music Entertainment chairman/CEO Tommy Mottola and after performing for him he signed them to his label. For nine months the girls recorded material for their debut album. Bailon discussed the developmental experience saying, "We've become like sisters. We sing, pray, and go to church as unit". She continued," We have bunk beds, and "the bond we share is unbreakable".

Release and promotion
Originally the album was scheduled to be released on November 14, but instead it was released on December 5, 2000.  Beginning in May 2000, a marketing campaign was implemented to promote the group. During the summer-campaign 3LW cassette tape samplers and bounce-back postcards were distributed on the 'N Sync, Sisqó and Christina Aguilera tours. For an entire month 3LW were a part of Ed McMahon's mall and high school tour to introduce/promote his new internet venture, "Nextbigstar.com". They also had sponsored gigs with Adidas and Jump Magazine. After the album release, 3LW was expected to make several televised appearances on BET, Soul Train and Nickelodeon. The group was also to be featured in teen-oriented magazines such as Seventeen and Teen People. 3LW also went on a European promotional tour in support of the project.

Critical reception

Ed Hogan from AllMusic praised the album for having a "fresh sound that deftly mixes hip-hop/R&B and pop." Overall, he felt that "The group's strong vocals and an overall adventurous vibe supplied by the album's producers and songwriters makes 3LW a pleasure." Michael Paoletta from Billboard felt the album was full of "radio-ready singles", and like their contemporaries the group is targeting their peers with their material in which they succeed at doing. Barry Walters from Rolling Stone felt that the group radiate prefab vibes due to their "jerky beats" and the "kewpie-doll coo of their radio-friendly crooning". Ultimately, he declared 3LW "rise above the crassness behind their creation by laying low: no bombastic ballads, no embarrassing between-track skits, no strained displays of virtuoso technique and fake emotion".

Track listing

Charts

Weekly charts

Year-end charts

Certifications

Release history

References

2000 debut albums
3LW albums
Epic Records albums